Nea Kifissia or Nea Kifisia B.C., or New Kifissia B.C. (Greek: Νέας Κηφισιάς KAE), is a Greek professional basketball club that is based in Kifissia, Athens, Greece. The club's full name is Athletic Union Nea Kifissia (Αθλητική Ένωση Νέας Κηφισιάς), which is also abbreviated as Α.E.Ν.Κ., which is the club's common name. The club is also known by the name A.E.N. Kifissia (Α.Ε.Ν. Κηφισιάς).

History

A.E.N.K. was founded in 1994, with the men's basketball section being started in 1996. The club competed in the Greek Second Division, for the first time, during the 2011–12 season. The club won the Greek Second Division championship in 2013.

They played in the top league in Greece, the Greek Basket League, for the first time in the 2013–14 season. The club's first season in the league was amazing, considering it was their first time competing in Greece's top division. They finished in fifth place in the regular season.

The success of the club has been compared with the success that Maroussi had in the Greek League in the recent previous years, in where a nearby local Athens community club (Marousi and Kifissia are located near each other) was able to achieve good results on the Greek national level.

In the 2016–17 season, the club qualified play for the first time in a European-wide league tournament, as they qualified to play in the Champions League. However, the club refused its place in the Champions League, due to financial issues. Nowadays the team competes in Greek C League.

In 2016, the club was relegated down from the first-tier Greek Basket League, to the third-tier Greek B League, due to financial problems.

Championships
Greek A2 League
Winners (1): 2012–13

Roster

Notable players

  Markos Kolokas
  Ioannis Psathas
  Dimitrios Kompodietas
  Vangelis Karampoulas
  Dimitrios Tsaldaris
  Nikos Liakopoulos
  Nikos Barlos
  Michalis Kakiouzis
  Dimitrios Mavroeidis
  Panagiotis Kafkis
  Leonidas Kaselakis
  Andreas Glyniadakis
  Nikos Gkikas
  Linos Chrysikopoulos
  Panagiotis Vasilopoulos
  Saša Vasiljević
  Nikola Pešaković
  Uroš Duvnjak
  Petar Popović
  Ogo Adegboye
  Patrick Ewing Jr.
  Tony Crocker
  Darrius Garrett
  Justin Jackson
  Cade Davis
  Dustin Hogue
  Muhammad El-Amin
  Roscoe Smith
  Robert Lowery
  Xavier Silas
  Tony Woods

Head coaches
  Ilias Papatheodorou

References

External links
Official Website 
Eurobasket.com Team Profile
A.E.N.K. Basketball Club 

Basketball teams in Greece
Basketball teams established in 1996